Canby School District is an  public school district based in Canby, Oregon, United States, and serving students in Canby and the surrounding rural area of Clackamas County, including the community of Carus, parts of the city of Wilsonville, and as far south as the Ninety-One School near Hubbard. There are approximately 5,000 students enrolled in the district's eight schools, which include five elementary schools, one middle school, one K-8 school, and one high school. The superintendent is Dr. Aaron Downs.

Demographics
According to the National Center for Education Statistics, the school district's general population was 82% Caucasian, 14% Hispanic or Latino of any race, 2% Asian, and 2% two or more races. The median household income was $67,892, with 10.8% of families making an income below the poverty level. Just 4.9% of children 5 years or older spoke English less than very well with 20.9% speaking English very well or 74.2% speaking English only.
From 2009 to 2017, the percentage of homeless students increased from 6.6% to 9.1%, and the total number thereof increased from 332 to 431.

Schools 

Canby's elementary schools are Carus, Eccles, Knight, Lee, and Trost; Baker Prairie serves students in grades 7-8, and Canby High serves students in grades 9-12. Its sole K-8 school, Ninety-One School, was formed from a merger of five rural schools in 1947. After heated debate over the name for the new school, in March 1950, it was named the "Ninety-One Joint School" after what was then School District 91. A month later, the word "Joint" was dropped from the name.

References

External links
Historic image of Whiskey Hill School, which later became Ninety-one School from Salem Public Library

School districts in Oregon
Education in Clackamas County, Oregon
Canby, Oregon
Wilsonville, Oregon